Mark Frost is an English actor who has worked widely in both theatre and television. In television, Frost is known as a series regular as Steve Rawlings in Doctors, Jeffrey Simpson in The Bill, Tom Carne in Poldark, and Ray Crosby in Coronation Street.

Filmography

Stage

References

External links
 

20th-century English male actors
21st-century English male actors
English male film actors
English male soap opera actors
Living people
Year of birth missing (living people)